The Knights of the Southern Cross (KSC) is a Catholic fraternal order committed to promoting the Christian way of life throughout Australia.

The Order was founded in Sydney in 1919 with the approval of the Catholic Bishops of Australia. When it was formed, the purpose of the organisation was correcting discrimination against Catholics, particularly in employment.

In 1922 it merged with its Victorian counterpart the Knights of St. Francis Xavier.
In 1922, branches were formed in Queensland, South Australia, Western Australia and in New Zealand. In 1923, a branch was established in Tasmania.

Branches operate in many Catholic Parishes throughout Australia and membership is open to Catholic men over the age of 18.

St. Mary MacKillop is patron saint of the Knights of the Southern Cross.

The order also established the non-profit aged care organisation, Southern Cross Care.

The objects of the order

 To promote the advancement of Australia
 To foster the Christian way of life throughout the nation
 To promote the welfare of members of the Order and their families
 To encourage spiritual, social and intellectual activities amongst members of the Order
 To conduct and support educational, charitable, religious and social welfare work

History 
The Order was founded in 1919 in Sydney at a time when Catholics were regarded with suspicion by the Protestant majority in Australia. The two co-founders were Patrick Minahan, a boot manufacturer and member of the NSW Legislative Assembly, and Joseph Lynch, a school inspector. Within a year of its establishment over 1,000 men had joined the order from every state in Australia and a national council was established to oversee the organisation.

In the beginning it served to assist Catholic servicemen returned from the First World War in finding employment, and also to defend the rights and interests of the Catholic Church in Australia – a mission which it continues to promote today.

In 1968, the organisation established Southern Cross Homes (now Southern Cross Care), building its first retirement village in the Adelaide suburb of Croydon.

International Alliance of Catholic Knights 
Through the International Alliance of Catholic Knights, the Knights of the Southern Cross are associated with the Knights of Columbus, the Knights of St Columbanus, the Knights of Da Gama, the Knights of Peter Claver, the Knights of the Southern Cross (New Zealand) and the Knights of Saint Columba.

Notes and references

External links
Knights of the Southern Cross

Catholic Church in Australia
Religious organisations based in Australia
1919 establishments in Australia
Christian organizations established in 1919
Southern Cross